Puji is a town in Wangcang County, Sichuan, China.

Administrative division 
As of 2017, the town is divided into twelve villages and two communities: 
 Puziling Community
 Daichiba Community
 Jiujiang
 Xiumei
 Longchi
 Foziyan
 Hengshi
 Zhongjiang
 Chichuan
 Daying
 Hongjiang
 Yuexi
 Qingjiang
 Yuanjing

History 
It was incorporated as a township in 1940.

After establishment of the Communist State, in 1950, Puji District was set up. In 1961, during the Great Leap Forward, it was renamed "Puji People's Commune". In 1962, former Tiantai Township, Yuanjing Township and Puji Township merged to form Puji Town.

In January 2021, 22 stone Buddha statues of the Tang dynasty (618 907) and one stone sheep of the Ming dynasty (1368 1644) in the Foziyan Cliff Inscriptions were stolen.

Geography 
It lies at the south central Wangcang County, bordering the town of Huangyang to the west, Longfeng Township and Mumen Town to the south, Daliang Township to the north, and Sanjiang Town to the east.

Qing Stream, a tributary of the Qu River, flows through the town north to south.

Economy 
The town's economy is based on nearby mineral resources and agricultural resources. The main crops are rice, wheat and corn. Vegetable and rape are the economic plants of this region.

The region abounds with coal, bluestone, sulfur, iron, copper, dolomite, and limestone.

Demographics 

As of 2019, the National Bureau of Statistics of the People's Republic of China estimates the town's population now to be 27,045.

Transportation 
The town is connected to two highways: the Provincial Highway S16 and the Provincial Highway S20, both pass across the south of the town.

Tourist attractions 
The Foziyan Cliff Inscriptions is a historical site of the Tang dynasty (618 907) in Sichuan and is a provincial cultural relic preservation organ.

References

Bibliography 
 

 

 

Divisions of Wangcang County